This is a list of members of the New South Wales Legislative Council from 1843 to 1851. The 1843 Electoral Act prescribed 36 members, 24 to be elected, 6 appointed by virtue of their office (Colonial Secretary, Colonial Treasurer, Auditor-General, Attorney General, Commander of the forces and Collector of Customs) and 6 nominated. The appointments and elections were for five year terms and thus occurred in 1843, and 1848. The Speaker was Alexander Macleay until 19 May 1846 and then Charles Nicholson. The parliament was dissolved on 30 June 1851 as a result of the 1851 Electoral Act which increased the number of members in the Council to 54 (18 to be appointed and 36 elected).

See also

Results of the 1843 and 1848 elections

Notes

References

Members of New South Wales parliaments by term
19th-century Australian politicians